Valentyna Brik (born 31 August 1985) is a Ukrainian Paralympic volleyballist who won a bronze medal at the 2012 Summer Paralympics in sitting volleyball competition. She graduated from Zaporozhye National University in Zaporozhye, Ukraine with a degree in Physical Education.

References

1985 births
Paralympic volleyball players of Ukraine
Paralympic bronze medalists for Ukraine
Living people
Medalists at the 2012 Summer Paralympics
Volleyball players at the 2012 Summer Paralympics
Ukrainian sitting volleyball players
Women's sitting volleyball players
Paralympic medalists in volleyball